Langaville is a township located near Tsakane, in Gauteng province, South Africa.

References

Populated places in Ekurhuleni
Townships in Gauteng